Forbidden Zone (Original Motion Picture Soundtrack) is the soundtrack album to Forbidden Zone, the 1982 cult film directed by Richard Elfman, with music by Danny Elfman and performed by The Mystic Knights of the Oingo Boingo.

The album marked the soundtrack debut of composer Danny Elfman, who was frontman to the Mystic Knights at time of recording.

The soundtrack album is the only public release accredited to The Mystic Knights of the Oingo Boingo, recorded between 1978 and 1979—during which time the band was transitioning into Oingo Boingo. Initial tracks were recorded by the Mystic Knights before their disbanding and completed by members of Oingo Boingo a year later, resulting in the mix of musicians credited on the album.  In the liner notes, Danny Elfman writes that "sixty minutes of original music in a dozen different styles needed to be created in and around various older, and often uneven, pre-recorded pieces," and were composed, arranged and recorded in a period of two weeks.

While the original Varèse Sarabande LP version contained 22 tracks, the label reissued the album in 1990 with the tracks "Pico and Sepulveda" and "La Petite Tonkinoise" removed. Two additional tracks, "Some of These Days" and "Bim Bam Boom", were removed for the French release.

Track listing

Credits
Principal musicians are:

Danny Elfman (Lead Vocals)
Steve Bartek (Guitar)
Kerry Hatch (Bass)
John Hernandez (Drums, Percussion)
Sam Phipps (Reeds, Flute)
Leon Schneiderman (Reeds, Flute)
Dale Turner (Trumpet)
Stuart Elster (Piano)
Brad Kay (Piano)
Dan Schmidt (Synthesizer)
Carol Emmanuel (Harp)

References

1983 soundtrack albums
Danny Elfman soundtracks
1980s film soundtrack albums
Oingo Boingo albums
Varèse Sarabande soundtracks